The Plotters is an original novel written by Gareth Roberts and based on the long-running British science fiction television series Doctor Who. It features the First Doctor, Ian, Barbara and Vicki.

Plot Synopsis
The TARDIS materialises in London, the date November 1605. While Ian and Barbara set off for the Globe Theatre, Vicki accompanies the Doctor on a mysterious mission to the court of King James. What is the link between the King's adviser, Robert Cecil, with the hooded figure called 'the Spaniard'? Why is the Doctor so anxious to observe the translation of the Bible? And what is brewing in the cellars of the Houses of Parliament?

References

External links
The Cloister Library - The Plotters

Fiction set in 1605
1996 British novels
1996 science fiction novels
Virgin Missing Adventures
First Doctor novels
Novels by Gareth Roberts (writer)
Cultural depictions of Guy Fawkes